ADSS can stand for:
 Actes et documents du Saint Siège relatifs à la Seconde Guerre Mondiale Papal documents during the Second World War
 ADSS (ADS Securities), a private financial services firm headquartered in Abu Dhabi
 Alberni District Secondary School, a high school in British Columbia Canada
 All-dielectric self-supporting cable, a type of fibre optic cable used by electrical power transmission companies
 Adenylosuccinate synthase, an enzyme